The 2020 United States House of Representatives elections in Alabama were held on November 3, 2020, to elect the seven U.S. representatives from the state of Alabama, one from each of the state's seven congressional districts. The elections coincided with the 2020 U.S. presidential election, as well as other elections to the House of Representatives, elections to the United States Senate, and various state and local elections.

Overview

By district
Results of the 2020 United States House of Representatives elections in Alabama by district:

District 1

The 1st district is home to the city of Mobile, and includes Washington, Mobile, Baldwin, Escambia and Monroe counties. The incumbent is Republican Bradley Byrne, who was re-elected with 63.2% of the vote in 2018, and announced on February 20, 2019, that he would seek the Republican nomination for U.S. Senate in 2020.

Republican primary

Candidates

Declared
Jerry Carl, Mobile County commissioner
John Castorani, U.S. Army veteran
Bill Hightower, former state senator and candidate for Governor of Alabama in 2018
Wes Lambert, businessman
Chris Pringle, state representative

Declined
Bradley Byrne, incumbent U.S. Representative (running for U.S. Senate)
Rusty Glover, former state senator
Terry Lathan, chair of the Alabama Republican Party

Endorsements

Polling

Primary results

Runoff results

Democratic primary

Candidates

Declared
 James Averhart, U.S. marines veteran
Rick Collins, real estate agent
Kiani Gardner, college professor and biologist

Primary results

Runoff results

General election

Predictions

Results

District 2

The 2nd district encompasses most of the Montgomery metropolitan area, and stretches into the Wiregrass Region in the southeastern portion of the state, including Andalusia, Dothan,  Greenville, and Troy. The incumbent is Republican Martha Roby, who was re-elected with 61.4% of the vote in 2018; on July 26, 2019, she announced she would not seek re-election.

Republican primary

Candidates

Declared
Thomas W. Brown Jr., statistician
Jeff Coleman, businessman
Terri Hasdorff, consulting firm president
Troy King, former Alabama Attorney General
Barry Moore, former state representative
Bob Rogers, electrician
Jessica Taylor, businesswoman and attorney

Withdrawn
Will Dismukes, state representative

Declined
Wes Allen, state representative
Donnie Chesteen, state senator
Clyde Chambliss, state senator
Martha Roby, incumbent U.S. Representative

Endorsements

Polling

Primary results

Runoff results

Democratic primary

Candidates

Declared
Phyllis Harvey-Hall, education consultant and retired teacher
Nathan Mathis, former state representative and nominee for Alabama's 2nd congressional district in 2016

Primary results

General election

Predictions

Results

District 3

The 3rd district is based in eastern Alabama, taking in small parts of Montgomery, as well as, Talladega, Tuskegee and Auburn. The incumbent is Republican Mike Rogers, who was re-elected with 63.7% of the vote in 2018.

Republican primary

Candidates

Declared
Mike Rogers, incumbent U.S. Representative

Democratic primary

Candidates

Declared
Adia Winfrey, clinical psychologist and candidate for Alabama's 3rd congressional district in 2018

General election

Predictions

Results

District 4

The 4th district is located in rural north-central Alabama, spanning the Evangelical belt area. The incumbent is Republican Robert Aderholt, who was re-elected with 79.8% of the vote in 2018.

Republican primary

Candidates

Declared
Robert Aderholt, incumbent U.S. Representative

Endorsements

Democratic primary

Candidates

Declared
Rick Neighbors

General election

Predictions

Results

District 5

The 5th district is based in northern Alabama, including the city of Huntsville. The incumbent is Republican Mo Brooks, who was re-elected with 61.0% of the vote in 2018.

Republican primary

Candidates

Declared
Mo Brooks, incumbent U.S. Representative
Chris Lewis, U.S. Navy veteran

Results

General election

Predictions

Results

District 6

The 6th district encompasses Greater Birmingham, taking in parts of Birmingham, as well as the surrounding suburbs, including Bibb, Blount, Chilton, Coosa, and Shelby counties. The incumbent is Republican Gary Palmer, who was re-elected with 69.2% of the vote in 2018.

Republican primary

Candidates

Declared
Gary Palmer, incumbent U.S. Representative

General election

Predictions

Results

District 7

The 7th district encompasses the Black Belt, including Selma and Demopolis, as well as taking in majority-black areas of Birmingham, Tuscaloosa, and Montgomery. The incumbent is Democrat Terri Sewell, who was re-elected with 97.8% of the vote in 2018, without major-party opposition.

Democratic primary

Candidates

Declared
Terri Sewell, incumbent U.S. Representative

General election

Predictions

Results

Notes

Partisan clients

References

External links
 
 
  (state affiliate of the U.S. League of Women Voters)
 

Official campaign websites for 1st district candidates
 James Averhart (D) for Congress
 Jerry Carl (R) for Congress

Official campaign websites for 2nd district candidates
 Phyllis Harvey-Hall (D) for Congress
 Barry Moore (R) for Congress

Official campaign websites for 3rd district candidates
 Mike Rogers (R) for Congress
 Adia Winfrey (D) for Congress

Official campaign websites for 4th district candidates
 Robert Aderholt (R) for Congress
 Rick Neighbors (D) for Congress

Official campaign websites for 5th district candidates
 Mo Brooks (R) for Congress

Official campaign websites for 6th district candidates
 Gary Palmer (R) for Congress
 Kaynen Pellegrino (I) for Congress

Official campaign websites for 7th district candidates
 Terri Sewell (D) for Congress

Alabama
2020
House